The Royal Guard is an independent regiment of the Spanish Armed Forces that is dedicated to the protection of the King of Spain and members of the Spanish royal family. It currently has a strength of 1,500 troops. While the guard does participate in parades and other ceremonial events, it is a fully functional combat unit. Its members are recruited from the ranks of all three branches of the Spanish Armed Forces and receive the same combat training as regular soldiers.

The guard contains a diverse mix of units: a Royal Marines company from the Navy, a paratroop company from the Air and Space Force and an infantry company from the Army, among others. Some units served in recent times in Afghanistan and Bosnia.

History 

The history of the Royal Guard dates back to medieval times. The senior unit and one of the oldest body guards in the world is the Corps of Gentlemen of the Chamber, the Monteros de Espinosa, dating to 1006 and created by Sancho Garcia of the House of Castile.

Even before the time of the first monarch of Spain, the Catholic Monarchs formed the group called the Guardias Viejas de Castilla ("Old Guards of Castile"). Later on, the first monarch of Spain, Charles V ordered that a company of those guards to reside and continuously stand guard in his palace, denominating it Los Cien Continos ("The Continuous Hundred").

Official formation 
Later on, Charles V's father, Philip the Handsome arrived in Spain in 1502 brought with him his Guardia Borgoñona ("Burgundian Guards"). They were also called the Guardia de los Archeros (aka Guardia de Cuchilla > "Guards of the Blade") because they were armed with a glaive-type polearm called an archa, not because they were archers (arqueros). Their purpose was to secure the royal household by standing guard or patrolling the grounds on horseback. These group of Royal Guards with their Burgundian style, together with two units of alabarderos ("halberdiers"), will remain in service until the reorganization of the "Troops of the Royal Household" (Tropas de Casa Real) by Philip V. During his reign, the royal guards were organized into:

 Headquarters
 Royal Guards Halberdiers
 Royal Carabinier Guards
 Musketeers of the Royal Guards
 Guards de Corps (organized as a squadron)
 Two Guards infantry regiments (Walloon Guards and Guards of Spain)

In the 19th century the guards were reinforced by the Spanish Marine Infantry, which formed its own unit.

In 1824-25 the Guard was expanded into a full independent army group reporting to the sovereign and the Royal Military Household with two full corps following the example of France's Napoleonic Imperial Guard and Borbon Restorationist Royal Guards:

 Internal Royal Guards Corps
 Halberdiers

 Guards of the Royal Household
 Guards de Corps
 Infantry units
 External Royal Guards Corps
 1st Guards Infantry Division 
 1st and 2nd Guards Infantry Brigades, organized into two to three regiments of infantry
 1st Guards Cavalry Division
 1st and 2nd Guards Cavalry Brigades
 Royal Horse Artillery Battery
 Train Company 
 Royal Guard Company of Sappers and Miners
 2nd Guards Infantry Division (Provincial)
 Royal Guard Grenadiers Brigade
 Royal Guards Rifle Brigade

In the 1840s only the internal units of the Royal Guards remained as the others were disbanded or transferred to the regular Army. In 1868 the Halberdiers stood down, only to be reformed under King Amadeo I as the Royal Guard Battalion of one infantry company and one cavalry troop and revived as a full battalion under his successor Alfonso XII.

Civil War 
The guards were disbanded in 1931 as a result of the formation of the 2nd Republic and was replaced by the "Presidential Horse Guards Squadron" (Escuadrón de Escolta Presidencial), which was a cavalry formation. By 1936, it included the infantry "Presidential Guards Battalion" (batallón de Guardia Presidencial), which remained loyal to the Republic during the civil war.

Restoration 
Under Francisco Franco, By Decree of February 4, 1949, the Military House of the Generalissimo was reorganized and on the basis of the republican formations the "Regiment of the Guards of His Excellency the Head of State" (Regimiento de la Guardia de Su Excelencia el Jefe del Estado), later on the "Guards Regiment of HE the Generalissimo" (Regimiento de la Guardia de S.E. el Generalísimo), was activated, which included a mounted squadron (the Guardia Mora) which was first raised from surplus personnel of the Regulares. After several reorganizations, the unit would last until Franco's death as a combined arms guard regiment.

Upon Franco’s death & the ascension of King Juan Carlos I as the head of state and commander in chief of the armed forces, the guard regiment was integrated into the new army under the king & formed the basis of what is now the modern day Guardia Real - the "Royal Guards Regiment" (Regimento de la Guardia Real), which is responsible to the king thru the Ministry of Defense. In the 1980s it grew into a three-battalion regiment. Today it is a four battalion unit that serves as the protocol and security service of the Spanish Royal Family.

Role 

The primary function of the Royal guard is to provide military security for the Monarchy. In addition to protecting members of Spanish Royal Family, the present functions of the unit include the protection of foreign heads of state visiting Spain, and of royal palaces such as the Royal Palace of Madrid (Palacio Real), the Palace of El Pardo and the Palace of Zarzuela.

The regiment is an active combat unit and has been deployed to Bosnia and Afghanistan. The guard regularly takes part in military exercises organized in conjunction with all three of the main branches of Spains military.

It is involved in the guard mounting ceremony (Cambio de la Guardia) at the Royal Palace on the first Wednesday of every month from 12 midday to 2pm (save for July, August and September). It is present at military parades in the national capital of Madrid on official holidays including Fiesta Nacional de España and Día de la Constitución. Annually, it has a troop review during the Pascua Militar ceremony on 6 January.

Organization 

 Commander of the Royal Guard (Colonel)
 General Staff
 Personnel Logistics (1st SEM)
 Institutional Affairs (2nd SEM)
 Security and Intelligence, Preparation and Employment (3rd SEM)
 Material and Infrastructure Logistics (4th SEM)
 Economic Affairs Section (SAE)
 Occupational Risk Prevention Service (SPRL)
 Legal Advisor (ASEJU)
 Office of the Sergeant Major of the Royal Guard (SBMY)
 Religious Service (SRELG)
 Secretary
 Group HQ
 HQ Company
 Security Company
 1st Security platoon 
 2nd Security platoon
 3rd Security platoon
 4th Security platoon
 Communications Company
 Formation Company 
 1st platoon
 2nd platoon
 3rd platoon
 4th platoon
 Escorts Group
 Group HQ
 Military Control Company
 Perimeter Control Section
 Interior Control Section
 Bomb Detection/Attack Dog Section
 Motorcycle Section
 Alabarderos (Halberdiers) Company
 1st Immediate Security Section
 2nd Immediate Security Section
 Alabarderos Section
 Royal Escort Squadron
 Mounted Band of Timpani and Bugles
 Mounted Marker Squad
 Cuirassiers Troop
 1st Lancers Troop
 2nd Lancers Troop
 Royal Horse Artillery Battery
 Equestrian Training Unit
 Honors Group
 Group HQ
 Army Company "Monteros de Espinosa"
 1st Platoon
 2nd Platoon
 3rd Platoon
 Drill Team Platoon
 Navy and Marine Composite Company "Mar Océano"
 1st Platoon
 2nd Platoon
 3rd Platoon
 4th platoon
 Air and Space Force Squadron "Plus Ultra"
 1st Flight
 2nd Flight
 3rd Flight
 4th Flight
 Mountaineering Group
 Diving Unit
 Sniper Unit 
 Logistics Group
 Group HQ
 Administration Company
 Maintenance Company
 Transportation Company
 Logistics Directorates
 Medical Unit
 Musical Unit of the Armed Forces Royal Guard
 Musical Unit HQ and High Command
 Military Band of the Royal Guard of Spain
 Corps of Drums of the Royal Guard (Drums and bugles)
 Fife Section and Pipe band
 Brass band of the Royal Guard
 Royal Guard Big band
 Royal Guard Chamber Ensembles

List of commanders

Ranks

Enlisted

See also 
 Garde du Corps (France)
 Republican Guard (France)
 National Republican Guard (Portugal)
 King's Guard, British equivalent

References

External links 

 Official website of the Royal Guard (in Spanish)

Guard, Spanish Royal
Spanish Army
Royal guards
Guards regiments
Spanish monarchy
Spanish ceremonial units
Military units and formations established in 1504
Military units and formations disestablished in 1931
Military units and formations established in 1949